= Jiuxiang River =

River in the People's Republic of China

Location
- Country: China
- Region: Jiangsu Province
- Municipality: Nanjing

The Jiuxiang River (Chinese: ; pinyin: Jiu Xiang; Wade–Giles: ) is a rather small river near Nanjing in Jiangsu Province, China.

== Geography ==
The Jiuxiang River is located at 32°01-32'N 118°52'-119°01'E in the eastern part of Nanjing. It drains 106.2 km2. In the north of the basin the terrain is flat, and the central and northern basin is an important agricultural area for Nanjing.

== Cities along the river ==
- Nanjing

== Environmental protection ==
Construction and agriculture have the most impact on water quality, while forested land also has an impact. Prior to 2003, the area was mostly agricultural, but is becoming rapidly urbanized. The area of cultivated land has decreased substantially.
